Stringtown is an unincorporated community in Center Township, Hancock County, Indiana.

Geography

References

Unincorporated communities in Hancock County, Indiana
Unincorporated communities in Indiana
Indianapolis metropolitan area